The 2001 Big 12 men's basketball tournament was the postseason men's basketball tournament for the Big 12 Conference. It was played from March 8 to 11 in Kansas City, Missouri at Kemper Arena. Oklahoma won the tournament for the 1st time and received the conference's automatic bid to the 2001 NCAA tournament.

Seeding
The Tournament consisted of a 12 team single-elimination tournament with the top 4 seeds receiving a bye.

Schedule

Bracket 

* Indicates overtime game

All-Tournament Team
Most Outstanding Player – Nolan Johnson, Oklahoma

See also
2001 Big 12 Conference women's basketball tournament
2001 NCAA Division I men's basketball tournament
2000–01 NCAA Division I men's basketball rankings

References 

Big 12 men's basketball tournament
Tournament
Big 12 men's basketball tournament
Big 12 men's basketball tournament
College sports tournaments in Missouri